Fernando Faustino Muteka was the Angolan minister for transport from 1978 to 1984.

References 

Angolan politicians
Living people
Governors of Bié
Governors of Huambo
Governors of Namibe
Agriculture ministers of Angola
Communication ministers of Angola
Territory Administration ministers of Angola
Transports ministers of Angola
1944 births